26 Years Diary ( Anata wo Wasurenai;  Neoreul Ijji Anheulgeoya; literally "I Won't Forget You") is a biopic that tells the story of Lee Su-hyon's  life and death.

The film details the 26-year-old Korean student's experiences in Japan, including going to school and his developing romance with a Japanese student (played by Mākii). He died on January 21, 2001, along with a Japanese photographer, Shiro Sekine, while both were trying to save the life of a man who had fallen onto the tracks at the Shin-Ōkubo Station in Tokyo. The soundtrack of the movie is the song "Okizarisu" by High and Mighty Color.

Plot
The film is based on a true story, Soo-hyun (Lee Taesung) travels from Korea, studying in Japan he meets Yuri (High and Mighty Color's lead singer, Maakii). Both share similar interests in music and sports as they become closer while dealing with language and racial barriers.

Cast
Lee Tae-sung as Lee Soo-hyun 
Maki Onaga as Yuri Hoshino
Takatoshi Kaneko as Ryuji Kazama
Naoto Takenaka as Kazuma Hirata
 as Rumiko Okamoto (Miruki)

 as Humie Hoshino
Miho Yoshioka as Asako Kojima
Jung Dong-hwan as Soo-hyun's father
Lee Kyung-jin as Shin Yun-chan 
Lee Seol-ah as Lee Su-geon 
Hong Kyung-min

References

External links 
 
News story of actual incident

2007 films
Japanese biographical films
Japanese multilingual films
2000s Japanese-language films
South Korean biographical films
South Korean multilingual films
Films about Japan–Korea relations
South Korean films based on actual events
Japanese films based on actual events
2000s Japanese films
2000s South Korean films